Psathyrotopsis is a genus of North American plants in the tribe Bahieae within the family Asteraceae.

 Species
 Psathyrotopsis hintoniorum B.L.Turner - Coahuila
 Psathyrotopsis purpusii (Brandegee) Rydb. - Coahuila
 Psathyrotopsis scaposa (A.Gray) H.Rob. - Chihuahua, Texas, New Mexico

References

Asteraceae genera
Bahieae